Mylothris crawshayi is a butterfly in the family Pieridae. It is found in Malawi, Zambia and Tanzania. The habitat consists of montane forests and montane forest-grassland mosaic.

Adults have a fast flight compared to other Mylothris species.

The larvae feed on Santalales species and Phragmanthera usuiensis.

Subspecies
Mylothris crawshayi crawshayi (northern Malawi, eastern Zambia)
Mylothris crawshayi bunduki Berger, 1980 (eastern Tanzania)

References

Seitz, A. Die Gross-Schmetterlinge der Erde 13: Die Afrikanischen Tagfalter. Plate XIII 11

Butterflies described in 1896
Pierini
Butterflies of Africa
Taxa named by Arthur Gardiner Butler